ZFM-FM is a Rhythm and Blues, hip hop and Caribbean music radio station in Freeport, Bahamas.

External links 
  (Official Facebook page)
  (Official Twitter feed)

Radio stations in the Bahamas
Rhythmic contemporary radio stations
Urban contemporary radio stations
Hip hop radio stations
Caribbean music